George Washington Fithian (July 4, 1854 – January 21, 1921) was a U.S. Representative from Illinois.

Born near Willow Hill, Illinois to Glover Fithian (1818–1861) and Mary Ann Catt, Fithian attended the common schools.
Learned the printer's trade in Mount Carmel, Illinois.
He studied law.
He was admitted to the bar in 1875 and commenced practice in Newton, Illinois.
He served as prosecuting attorney of Jasper County 1876-1884.

Fithian was elected as a Democrat to the Fifty-first, Fifty-second, and Fifty-third Congresses (March 4, 1889 – March 3, 1895).
He served as chairman of the Committee on Merchant Marine and Fisheries (Fifty-third Congress).
He was an unsuccessful candidate for reelection in 1894 to the Fifty-fourth Congress.
Railroad and warehouse commissioner of Illinois 1895-1897.
He resumed the practice of law and engaged in agricultural pursuits and stock raising in Newton, Illinois.
He was also the owner of an extensive cotton plantation near Falcon, Mississippi.
He died in Memphis, Tennessee, January 21, 1921.
He was interred in Riverside Cemetery, Newton, Illinois.

References

1854 births
1921 deaths
Democratic Party members of the United States House of Representatives from Illinois
19th-century American politicians
19th-century American lawyers
20th-century American lawyers
Illinois lawyers
People from Jasper County, Illinois
People from Newton, Illinois